USS Thrush (MSC-204) was a  in the service of the United States Navy from 1955 to 1975.

Construction
The second Thrush was laid down 7 May 1954, by Tampa Marine Company, Tampa, Florida; launched on 5 January 1955, as AMS-204; sponsored by Mrs. Edgar S. Russell; reclassified as MSC-204, on 7 February 1955; and commissioned on 8 November 1955.

Assignments
Soon after her commissioning in November 1955, Thrush arrived in Chesapeake Bay to conduct a successful shakedown cruise. In 1956, she was assigned to the Yorktown, Virginia, Mine Warfare School, followed in August by assignment to Norfolk, Virginia, to participate in Operation Hideaway. In 1957, Thrush moved to her new homeport in Key West, Florida, where she tested and evaluated new mine warfare equipment for the 6th Naval District's Mine Warfare Evaluation Detachment.

In 1974, she assisted in expanding the Osborne Artificial Reef.  While serving as a Naval Reservist, LeRoy Collins Jr. was Thrushs commanding officer.

Notes 

Citations

Bibliography 

Online resources

External links 

 

Bluebird-class minesweepers
Ships built in Tampa, Florida
1955 ships
Cold War minesweepers of the United States
Adjutant-class minesweepers